Su Htat (born Su Htat Htat on 5 September 1994) is a Burmese actress, model and game streamer. She is best known for her role in the 2019 television series Ah Saung.

Early life and education 
Su Htat was born on 5 September 1994 in Yangon, Myanmar. She has an elder brother. She graduated high school from Basic Education High School No. 1 Dagon, before she studied at  Yangon University of Foreign Languages (YUFL) and graduated with B.A. in English in the year of 2015.

Acting career 
Su Htat participated in Miss Myanmar International 2017 competition and she was placed in the top 10 finalists. Her hard work as a model was noticed by the film industry and soon, film casting offers came rolling in. She made her acting debut in the film Eain Htaung, alongside Nay Dway and Khin Thazin, directed by Htoo Nwe Eain, released in 2017. 

In 2018, she starred in the horror series Ah Saung (Dormitory) where she played the main role, together with Nyein Thaw, Su Htat Kahtay, Sao Yoon Waddy Oo and Phyo Pa Pa Htoo, which aired on Fortune TV on 1 June 2019, it was a domestic hit, and led to the increase of recognition for her. Fortune TV Group surveyed and decided to continue Ah Saung with a second season, according to the audiences' desires after they made the surveying. So she continued shooting season 2 and it aired on 11 January 2020. In 2019, she made her big-screen debut with Oo Tu Mhar Tae Saung (Unordered Winter Weather) where she played the main role with Nyein Thaw, Nan Su Oo and Khin Zarchi Kyaw. She was chosen as a Star Fairy for the 2018 Star Awards, held in 2019. In 2020, she was cast in a main role in drama film Yangon In Love, directed by Htoo Paing Zaw Oo.

Streaming career
In January 2019, she started streaming and she is one of the earliest female game streamers in Myanmar streaming CS: GO and other online games. At the end of the year, she became one of the most popular game streamers in local. She was also a nominee for Myanmar Influencer Awards 2018 in the category of Gaming. In 2019, the Singapore-based esports team Impunity Esports has announced Su Htat as their new brand ambassador. She has been invited to Viewsonic metaverse launch event in September 2022.

Filmography

Films 
 Ein Daung (2017)
 Udu Mha De Saung (2020)
 Yangon Achit (TBA)

Television series

References

21st-century Burmese actresses
People from Yangon
1994 births
Living people